= Sablier 4 =

1950s French aircraft

General information
- Type: Tourism aircraft
- National origin: France
- Manufacturer: Sablier
- Number built: 1

History
- First flight: 1955

The Sablier 4 was a tourism aircraft built in France in the mid-1950s.

== Design ==
The Sablier 4 was a parasol monoplane designed for amateur construction.

== Specifications ==
Data from

General characteristics

- Crew: 1
- Length: 5.00 m (16 ft 5 in)
- Wingspan: 6.11 m (20 ft 1 in)
- Height: 1.75 m (5 ft 9 in)
- Wing area: 7.30 m^{2} (78.6 sq ft)
- Gross weight: 210 kg (463 lb)
- Powerplant: 1 × Aubier Dunne 2-cylinder air-cooled horizontally-opposed piston engine, 13 kW (18 hp)

Performance

- Maximum speed: 130 km/h (81 mph, 70 kn)
